Lingerie is a 1928 American silent war drama film directed by George Melford and starring Alice White, Malcolm McGregor and Mildred Harris. Copies of the film still survive.

Synopsis
While serving in World War I, an American soldier meets a young woman in Paris. Eventually realizing he is closer to her than his cheating wife, he marries her.

Cast
 Alice White as Angele Ree ('Lingerie') 
 Malcolm McGregor as Leroy Boyd 
 Mildred Harris as Mary 
 Armand Kaliz as Jack Van Cleeve 
 Cornelia Kellogg as Mary's Mother 
 Kit Guard as Leroy's Buddy 
 Victor Potel as Leroy's Buddy 
 Richard Carlyle as Pembrokee 
 Marcelle Corday as Modiste

References

Bibliography
 Munden, Kenneth White. The American Film Institute Catalog of Motion Pictures Produced in the United States, Part 1. University of California Press, 1997.

External links

1928 films
1920s war drama films
American war drama films
Films directed by George Melford
American silent feature films
1920s English-language films
Tiffany Pictures films
American World War I films
Films set in Paris
American black-and-white films
1928 drama films
Surviving American silent films
1920s American films
Silent American drama films
Silent war drama films